Thessaloniki ( Mitropolitiki Periohi Thessaloníkis, Metropolitan Area of Thessaloniki) is one of the regional units of Greece. It is part of the Region of Central Macedonia and its capital is the city of Thessaloniki.

Geography

The regional unit stretches from the Thermaic Gulf in the southwest to the Strymonic Gulf in the east. Two bodies of water are located in the north, Lake Koroneia in the heart of the regional unit and Lake Volvi in the east. There are farmlands throughout the west and southwest, with fewer in the northeast, north and along the Axios River valley. Mountainous areas include the Chortiatis in the west-central part, the Vertiskos in the north and parts of the Kerdylio mountains in the northeast. The regional unit borders on the Imathia regional unit to the southwest, Pella to the west, Kilkis to the north, Serres to the east and Chalkidiki to the south.

Its climate includes hot Mediterranean summers and cool to mild winters in low-lying areas and plains. Winter weather is very common in areas 500m above sea level and into the mountains.

History

The area that was to become the Thessaloniki regional unit was annexed by Greece in 1912, during the First Balkan War. The area was struck by an earthquake in 1978, and by flooding due to rainfall in October 2006. Mustafa Kemal Atatürk, founder of modern Turkey, was born in Salonica, the name for the city of Thessaloniki when it was part of the Ottoman Empire.

Administration

Municipalities
The Thessaloniki regional unit is subdivided into 14 municipalities. These are:

(Number corresponds to the map in the infobox.)
Ampelokipoi-Menemeni (2)
Chalkidona (13)
Delta (4)
Kalamaria (7)
Kordelio-Evosmos (8)
Lagkadas (9)
Neapoli-Sykies (10)
Oraiokastro (14)
Pavlos Melas (11)
Pylaia-Chortiatis (12)
Thermaikos (5)
Thermi (6)
Thessaloniki (1)
Volvi (3)

Prefecture

The Thessaloniki Prefecture was created when the area was annexed by Greece during the First Balkan War in 1913. At that time. its area was the largest prefecture in the country, covering about 7% of the total land. The prefectures of Pella and Kilkis were split off in 1930 and 1937 respectively, and after World War II in 1947, Imathia and Pieria were additionally created from land belonging to the Thessaloniki Prefecture.

As a part of the 2011 Kallikratis administrative reform, the prefecture was transformed into a regional unit within the Central Macedonia region, without any change in boundaries. At the same time, the municipalities were reorganized, according to the table below.

Provinces

Province of Thessaloniki
Province of Lagkadas
Note: Provinces no longer hold any legal status in Greece.

Transport

Roads and highways
The regional unit of Thessaloniki is connected with the following roads and highways.
Motorways:
A1/E75 (Republic of North Macedonia, Larissa, Athens)
A2/E90 (Kozani, Ioannina, Igoumenitsa) (Kavala, Xanthi, Alexandroupolis, Turkey)
A25/Ε79 (Serres, Bulgaria)
A25 (Macedonia International Airport, Nea Moudania)
National Roads:
ΕΟ2/Ε86 W (Edessa, Florina)
ΕΟ12/Ε79 Ν (Serres, Drama)
ΕΟ16, SW (Polygyros, Ouranopolis)
ΕΟ65, Ν (Kilkis, Doirani)

History
Until the A1/E75 motorway (constructed during the 1970s) and the A2/E90 motorway (constructed during the 1990s) were constructed, GR-1 and GR-2 were the main road links connecting the regional unit of Thessaloniki with other parts of the country.
Furthermore, parts of GR-67 (in the near future to form part of the A25) linking Chalkidiki, and GR-65 linking Kilkis, were converted into motorways during the 2000s.

Mass transit

Public transport services are provided by the Thessaloniki Urban Transport Organization
Thessaloniki Metro (under construction, to be completed in late 2023)

Communications
Most of the stations are in the city (see Thessaloniki#Communications).  Here are list of stations outside the city:

Thermi TV - Thermi

Major Sport Clubs

Iraklis (founded in 1908)
Aris (founded in 1914)
PAOK (founded in 1926)
Apollon Kalamarias (founded in 1926)
Agrotikos Asteras (founded in 1932)

See also
 List of settlements in the Thessaloniki regional unit
 Macedonia (Greece)

References

 
Prefectures of Greece
1914 establishments in Greece
Regional units of Central Macedonia